Dolinka refers to:

 Dolinka, Slovakia
 Dolinka, Człuchów County, Poland